Tamara Pál (born 1 September 2000) is a Hungarian handballer who plays for MTK Budapest.

In September 2018, she was included by EHF in a list of the twenty best young handballers to watch for the future.

She made her international debut on 21 April 2022 against Portugal.

Achievements 
Nemzeti Bajnokság I:
Winner: 2017, 2018, 2019
Magyar Kupa:
Winner: 2018, 2019
EHF Champions League:
Winner: 2017, 2018, 2019
Junior European Championship:
Winner: 2019
European Youth Olympic Festival:
Winner: 2017
Youth World Championship:
Finalist: 2018
Youth European Championship:
Bronze medalist: 2017
ISF World Schools Championship:
Winner: 2016, 2018

Awards and recognition
 All-Star Centre Back of the EHF Youth European Championship: 2017
 MVP of the ISF World Schools Championship: 2018
 Top Scorer of the Nemzeti Bajnokság I: 2021

References
   

      
2000 births
Living people
Sportspeople from Debrecen
Győri Audi ETO KC players 
Hungarian female handball players